Paprika oleoresin (also known as paprika extract and oleoresin paprika) is an oil-soluble extract from the fruits of Capsicum annuum or Capsicum frutescens, and is primarily used as a colouring and/or flavouring in food products. It is composed of vegetable oil (often in the range of 97% to 98%), capsaicin, the main flavouring compound giving pungency in higher concentrations, and capsanthin and capsorubin, the main colouring compounds (among other carotenoids). It is much milder than capsicum oleoresin, often containing no capsaicin at all.

Extraction is performed by percolation with a variety of solvents, primarily hexane, which are removed prior to use. Vegetable oil is then added to ensure a uniform color saturation.

Uses
Foods colored with paprika oleoresin include cheese, orange juice, spice mixtures, sauces, sweets, ketchup, soups, fish fingers, chips, pastries, fries, dressings, seasonings, jellies, bacon, ham, ribs, and among other foods even cod fillets. In poultry feed, it is used to deepen the colour of egg yolks.

In the United States, paprika oleoresin is listed as a color additive “exempt from certification”. In Europe, paprika oleoresin (extract), and the compounds capsanthin and capsorubin are designated by E160c.

Names and CAS nos

References

Flavors
Food science
Oleoresin
E-number additives